The Eyes of the World is a 1930 American pre-Code drama film directed by Henry King and written by Brewster Morse and Clarke Silvernail. The film stars Eulalie Jensen, Florence Roberts, Una Merkel, and Nance O'Neil. The film was released on August 30, 1930, by United Artists.

Cast
Eulalie Jensen as Mrs. Rutledge 
Hugh Huntley as James Rutledge 
Myra Hubert as Myra
Florence Roberts as The Maid
Una Merkel as Sybil
Nance O'Neil as Myra
John Holland as Aaron King
Fern Andra as Mrs. Taine
Frederick Burt as Conrad La Grange
Brandon Hurst as Mr. Taine
William Jeffrey as Bryan Oakley

Preservation status
This film is considered lost.

See also
List of lost films

References

External links

1930 films
American black-and-white films
1930s English-language films
Films directed by Henry King
United Artists films
1930 drama films
Lost American films
Films produced by Sol Lesser
Films based on American novels
Remakes of American films
Sound film remakes of silent films
1930 lost films
Lost drama films
1930s American films